Perttunen is a surname. Notable people with the surname include:

 Arhippa Perttunen (1769–1841), Karelian folk singer
 Väinö Perttunen (1906–1984), Finnish wrestler

Finnish-language surnames